The Slieve Bloom Way is a long-distance trail around the Slieve Bloom Mountains in Ireland. It is typically completed in three days. It is designated as a National Waymarked Trail by the National Trails Office of the Irish Sports Council and is managed by Laois County Council, Offaly County Council, Laois Integrated Development Company, Coillte and the Slieve Bloom Rural Development Society. The route was devised by a local man, Tom Joyce, and opened in 1987. The route was developed as part of the designation of the Slieve Bloom area as a European Environment Park in the European Year of the Environment.

References

Notes

Bibliography

External links
 Slieve Bloom Way at IrishTrails.ie
 Slieve Bloom Way at SlieveBloom.ie

Long-distance trails in the Republic of Ireland
Geography of County Laois
Geography of County Offaly
Tourist attractions in County Laois
Tourist attractions in County Offaly
FitzPatrick dynasty